Tamer Karatekin (born 1981) is a Turkish chess player. He is a former Turkish Chess Champion.

Biography 
Karatekin was born in Yugoslavia in 1981, started playing chess at the age of 6. He graduated from Istanbul High School, received a scholarship from MIT and studied engineering. As a chess player, he earned FIDE title, FIDE Master (FM) in 1997. He won the 2000 Turkish Chess Championship.

Achievements 
 2000 Turkish Chess Championship – Champion

References

External links 
 
 

1981 births
Living people
Turkish chess players
Chess FIDE Masters